Gadzhi-Eynali is a village in the Masally Rayon of Azerbaijan.

References 

Populated places in Masally District